Lucas Bergvall (born 2 February 2006) is a Swedish professional footballer who plays as a midfielder for Allsvenskan club Djurgårdens IF. He is considered one of the best football prospects of Sweden.

Club career 
He made his Superettan debut on 9 July 2022 in a 1–1 draw with Örgryte IS. On 4 October 2022 he scored his first goal against Östers IF. He joined Djurgården on 9 December 2022.

International career 
Bergvall has represented the Sweden U15 and U16 teams.

Personal life 
His older brother Theo Bergvall is also a footballer playing for Djurgårdens IF.

References

External links
 Profile at Djurgårdens IF website
 Lucas Bergvall at Svenskfotboll
 

2006 births
Living people
Swedish footballers
Superettan players
Association football midfielders
IF Brommapojkarna players
Djurgårdens IF Fotboll players